The Subcommittee on TARP, Financial Services and Bailouts of Public and Private Programs is a subcommittee within the U.S. House of Representatives's Oversight and Government Reform Committee. It was established in 112th Congress, during a committee reorganization spearheaded by the full committee's chairman, Darrell Issa, which restructured the various subcommittees' jurisdictions and increased the total number of subcommittees from five to seven.

Jurisdiction
The subcommittee was created primarily to provide oversight of the Troubled Asset Relief Program, or TARP, established in 2008.

Members, 112th Congress

References

Oversight TARP, Financial Services and Bailouts of Public and Private Programs